Abu Mohammed Abubakar al-Sheikawi (also known by the alias Darul Akeem wa Zamunda Tawheed, or Darul Tawheed; "the abode of monotheism"; born 1965, 1969 or 1975 – 19 May 2021) was a Kanuri terrorist who was the leader of Boko Haram, a Nigerian Islamist militant group. He served as deputy leader to the group's founder, Mohammed Yusuf, until Yusuf was executed in 2009.

Nigerian authorities believed that Shekau was killed in 2009 during clashes between security forces and Boko Haram until July 2010, when Shekau appeared in a video claiming leadership of the group. He has subsequently been regularly reported dead and was thought to use doubles. In March 2015, Shekau pledged allegiance to ISIL leader Abu Bakr al-Baghdadi. Shekau was a Salafi, until 2016, when he ended his relation to ISIL. 

On 21 May 2021, an investigation by The Wall Street Journal, backed by recent reports by Nigerian officials, stated that Shekau killed himself by detonating a suicide vest. Shekau's rival Abu Musab al-Barnawi later also stated that Shekau had killed himself. In June 2021, his death was confirmed by his surviving loyalists.

Biography

Early years
Shekau was born in Shekau town, in Tarmuwa local government, Yobe State; his exact date of birth is unknown but is said to be between 1965 and 1975. Shekau was an ethnic Kanuri, and also spoke Hausa, Fulani, Arabic, and English. He was said to have had a photographic memory. In 1990 he moved to the Mafoni area in Maiduguri and studied under a traditional cleric before entering the Borno College of Legal and Islamic Studies (now called Mohammed Goni College of Legal and Islamic Studies). Shekau left the college for ideological reasons and without earning a degree. He later met Mohammed Yusuf, the founder of Jamaat Ahlus Sunnah li Dawah wal Jihad, and became one of his deputies. Shekau was appointed the leader of the group in July 2009, after the death of Yusuf in the 2009 Boko Haram uprising. Shekau survived being shot in the leg during the 2009 attempt on his life by Nigerian security forces. He was married to one of Muhammad Yusuf's four widows. His nickname was “Darul Tawheed”, which translates as "specialist in tawheed", the Islamic concept of oneness of Allah.

Leader of Boko Haram
Shekau's leadership did not go unchallenged. He received a letter from al-Qaeda in the Islamic Maghreb giving him advice but he did not heed it. As a result of his erratic leadership, in 2012 a faction of the group broke off to form Jamaat Ansar al-Muslimin fi Bilād as-Sudn (Ansaru). This faction included his military commander Abu Muhammad al-Bauchawi, and religious advisor Sheikh Abu Osama al-Ansari Muhammad Awal al-Gombawi. Despite this, many soldiers and commanders stayed with Shekau, including military commanders Abu Sa'ad al-Bamawi and Muhammad Salafi. With his group mostly intact, Shekau engaged in conflict with Ansaru, killing their leader Abu Osama al-Ansari. As a result of this, and other arrests of Ansaru leaders by the Nigerian government, Ansaru did not pose a further threat to Shekau's leadership of the jihadi movement in Nigeria, and the group became defunct by 2015.

Shekau's fellow jihadist fighters were undisciplined and abused the populations they encountered, resulting in the establishment of civilian militias such as the Civilian Joint Task Force to fight them. Shekau was also thought to have killed his own religious advisors, including Sheikh Abd al-Malek al-Ansari al-Kadunawi and Abu al-Abbas al-Bankiwani.

In June 2012, the United States Department of State designated Shekau as a terrorist and effectively froze his assets in the United States. Since June 2013, the Department has had a standing reward of US$7 million for information leading to Shekau's capture through its Rewards for Justice program. In addition, the Nigerian army has offered a ₦50 million reward (approximately US$300,000) for Shekau.

In videos Shekau posted online, he boasted often about his invincibility; mocked various armies; and stated that he "cannot be stopped" and "cannot die except by the will of Allah". He has also boasted of being in possession of armoured tanks and other combat vehicles. His online videos frequently depict anti-American rhetoric, and he has made multiple threats to attack the U.S.

In one prominent incident, he took credit for the kidnapping of over 200 school girls in April 2014. Shekau also announced that the kidnapped girls have been converted to Islam. He has claimed to be waging a jihad against Christianity.

With the rise of the Islamic State in Iraq and Syria during 2014 and 2015, Shekau faced pressure from his commanders and soldiers to pledge his allegiance to IS leader Abu Bakr al-Baghdadi. A history of the group says that Shekau "was compelled to give allegiance, and that was through a coming together of the military commanders, and after he became convinced that the matter was about to go out of his hand, and that his throne would be shaken and emptied of him if he did not give allegiance". In August 2016, ISIL appointed Abu Musab al-Barnawi as the leader of the group in place of Shekau. Shekau refused to recognise Barnawi's authority and split off part of the group under its original name of Jamaat Ahlus Sunnah li Dawah wal Jihad, while Barnawi led the "Islamic State's West Africa Province" (ISWAP). While Shekau led his group, he only had 1,500 soldiers, whereas Barnawi had 3,500. Shekau has been widely denounced as following the ideology of the Khawarij by the Islamic State and West Africa province in Nigeria.

Following the split, many clashes occurred between Shekau and Barnawi's forces over the next years. Regardless, Shekau never fully renounced his allegiance to the Islamic State, instead framing the rebel infighting as being solely attributable to his local rivals.

Reports of death

Shekau was reported killed in 2009 but reappeared as the group leader less than a year later. The Nigerian army in mid-August 2013 stated that he was fatally wounded when soldiers raided a base of Boko Haram in Sambisa forest and had died between 25 July and 3 August. However, a video in September 2013 was released in which a man purported to be Shekau claimed he had not been killed. The Nigerian army also stated to have killed him during the 2014 Battle of Kodunga that lasted from 12 to 14 September. The Cameroonian military posted a photo and also claimed that their forces killed Shekau in September 2014. In response to these reports, security analyst Ryan Cummings commented, "Is this his fourth or fifth death? He dies more often than an iPhone battery." In early October 2014, a video was obtained by AFP news agency that showed Shekau alive, in which he mocked the Nigerian military's allegations that he had been killed.

Chadian President Idriss Déby claimed in mid-August 2015 that Shekau had been replaced by Mahamat Daoud without exactly specifying his fate. An audio message attributed to Shekau was released a few days later, in which he purportedly stated that he had neither been killed nor ousted as chief of the group.

Shekau was reported to have been "fatally wounded" during an airstrike in Taye village on 19 August 2016 by Nigerian Air Force which also killed some senior leaders of Boko Haram. On 25 September, a video of a man purported to be Shekau was released on YouTube, in which he claimed that he was alive and in good health.

On 27 June 2017, Shekau released a video in which he claimed responsibility for the abduction of Nigerian policewomen and criticized the Nigerian government for claiming that Boko Haram had been defeated. This video would seem to be further evidence of Shekau's continued survival. In February 2020, Shekau released a video threatening the minister of information and digital economy, Isa Ali Pantami, and making reference to what was done to Islamic scholar Ja'afar Mahmud Adam in Maiduguri when he preached against Boko Haram, Bulama Bukarti, explained why Boko Haram leader Shekau threatened the Minister in an interview with the BBC.

Death

In May 2021, fighting between ISWAP and Shekau's troops escalated. The former invaded Sambisa Forest, Boko Haram's traditional stronghold, and encircled Shekau on 19 May. ISWAP attempted to convince Shekau to surrender and acknowledged Barnawi's authority, but the Boko Haram leader refused. In the middle of the negotiations, Shekau reportedly used a suicide vest to kill himself as well as a senior ISWAP frontline commander who was talking to him at the time. ISWAP was surprised by this "dramatic" action.

In the next weeks, several sources gradually issued confirmations of his death. ISWAP declared Shekau dead in early June 2021, with  al-Barnawi condemning him as "someone who committed unimaginable terrorism". In mid June, Shekau's loyalists under Bakura Sahalaba confirmed his death, but also declared that they would continue to fight against ISWAP.

See also

Sharia in Nigeria
Slavery in 21st-century Islamism

References

Works cited

External links
 
 .
 Counter Extremism Project profile

20th-century births
2021 deaths
2021 suicides
Boko Haram members
Islamic State of Iraq and the Levant members
Islamist kidnappers
Kanuri people
Nigerian kidnappers
Nigerian Salafis
People from Yobe State
People who faked their own death
Leaders of Islamic terror groups
Salafi jihadists
Shooting survivors
Suicides by explosive device
Suicides in Nigeria